Félix Manuel Díaz Guzman (born 10 December 1983) is a Dominican professional boxer who challenged for the unified WBC, WBO, and The Ring light welterweight titles in 2017. As an amateur he won a gold medal at the 2008 Olympics and bronze at the 2003 Pan American Games.

Amateur career
The aggressive Southpaw brawler participated in the 2004 Summer Olympics for his native Caribbean country. There he lost 28:16 in the first round of the Lightweight (60 kg) division to Kazakhstan's eventual bronze medalist Serik Yeleuov.

At the PanAm Games 2007 he lost the quarterfinal 12:13 to Inocente Fiss. He qualified for the 2008 Olympics by defeating Myke Carvalho 8:6.

In Beijing though, he won all five bouts and after a controversial bout against Vastine, sensationally won Gold against reigning champion Manus Boonjumnong of Thailand. It was the nation's second ever Olympic gold after Félix Sánchez in 2004 and the second boxing medal after Pedro Nolasco won a bronze in Los Angeles in 1984.

Olympic games results 
2004 (as a lightweight)
Lost to Serik Yeleuov (Kazakhstan) 28-16

2008 (as a Light welterweight)
Defeated Eduard Hambardzumyan (Armenia) 11-4
Defeated John Joe Joyce (Ireland) 11-11
Defeated Morteza Sepahvand (Iran) 11-6
Defeated Alexis Vastine (France) 12-10
Defeated Manus Boonjumnong (Thailand) 12-4

World amateur championships results 
2007 (as a Light welterweight)
Defeated Su Hsiao Ken (Chinese Taipei) RSC 1
Lost to Masatsugu Kawachi (Japan) 14-15

Díaz ended his amateur career with a record of 280–40.

Professional career
He turned pro in 2009.  As a professional, he won a majority decision against Adrian Granados for the World Boxing Council Central American Boxing Federation title.

Professional boxing record

References

External links

Yahoo! Sports
PanAm 2007

1983 births
Lightweight boxers
Light-welterweight boxers
Boxers at the 2003 Pan American Games
Boxers at the 2004 Summer Olympics
Boxers at the 2008 Summer Olympics
Olympic boxers of the Dominican Republic
Olympic gold medalists for the Dominican Republic
Olympic medalists in boxing
Medalists at the 2008 Summer Olympics
Pan American Games bronze medalists for the Dominican Republic
Pan American Games medalists in boxing
Sportspeople from Santo Domingo
Central American and Caribbean Games gold medalists for the Dominican Republic
Competitors at the 2002 Central American and Caribbean Games
Central American and Caribbean Games medalists in boxing
Medalists at the 2003 Pan American Games
Living people
Dominican Republic male boxers
20th-century Dominican Republic people
21st-century Dominican Republic people